Carla Guelfenbein Dobry (born November 30, 1959) is a Chilean writer, winner of the Alfaguara Novel Prize in 2015 for her book Contigo en la distancia. Guelfenbein has published six novels; The most recent one is called La estación de las mujeres and it was published in April 2019.

Early life and education 
Carla Guelfenbein Dobry was born in Santiago, Chile, in 1959. She is of Russian-Jewish origin. She was exiled with her parents to England in 1976 as a result of the military coup of September 11, 1973 which meant the fall of the Popular Unity government. Her house had been raided and her mother, Eliana Dobry, professor of philosophy at the University of Chile and socialist militant, was detained by Pinochet's agents; her whereabouts were unknown for three weeks.

She had anorexia at the age of 17 and at the age of 18, her mother died of cancer, which is why is considered that she had a difficult adolescence.

She studied biology at University of Essex (specialty: population genetics) in United Kingdom and design at St Martin's School of Art, today Central Saint Martins College of Art and Design in London.

Career 
Guelfenbein has worked in various jobs related to creativity, being a designer for advertising agencies and art director in fashion magazines. She was art director and fashion editor at Elle magazine in Chile. She is a regular contributor to several mass media where she has a column titled Tan lejos, tan cerca in the Sunday magazine Mujer of La Tercera and has conducted a literature workshop.

She started publishing in a little late way, when she was already 40 years old. Since then, her work has achieved considerable success within Chile and throughout her career she has been translated into more than 14 languages.

The author has always presented characters that are part of that struggle that women have had in the society.

She attended to the literary workshops of Pía Barros and Gonzalo Contreras. She affirms that she began to write and read in her childhood.

She started to write prematurely, but she published her first novel, The reverse of the soul, in 2002, followed three years later by The woman of my life (chosen as the best novel of the year by the readers of El Mercurio) in 2008 her third book came out, The rest is silence. Her stories have appeared in various mass media, including the newspapers El País and El Mercurio. She also participated, along with other Spanish-speaking authors, in an anthology of commemorative stories of the five years of the Punto de Lectura seal.

In 2012, she published her fourth novel, Nadar desnudas, whose storyline goes by the time of the Popular Unity and the months after Pinochet's coup.

Contigo en la distancia, become the winner of a total of 707 manuscripts received for the award. Of these, 320 came from Spain, 106 from Mexico, 102 from Argentina, 77 from Colombia, 41 from the United States, 32 from Peru, 20 from Chile and 9 from Uruguay.

She is one of the most popular Chilean writers and her books have repeatedly appeared on the best-seller lists in Chile and have been translated into several languages; for example, The woman of my life has been published in 14 languages, with a good reception from both readers and critics alike.

Personal life
Carla Guelfenbein returned to Chile in 1987, and currently resides in Santiago.

She has two children Micaela Altamirano Guelfenbein (1994) and Carlos Sebastián Altamirano Guelfenbein (1997) of her marriage with Juan Carlos Altamirano Celis, a former Programming Manager of TVN 2005 and son of the socialist leader Carlos Altamirano Orrego. However, she is currently separated.

Novels 
 The reverse of the soul, novel, Alfaguara, Santiago, 2002
 The woman of my life, novel, Alfaguara, Santiago, 2005
 The rest is silence, novel, Planeta, Santiago, 2008
 Nadar desnudas, novela, Alfaguara, Santiago, 2012 (The International Literary Quarterly had advanced chapter 14 in its Nº12, October 2010)
 Contigo en la distancia, novel, Alfaguara, Santiago, 2015
 Take me to heaven, novel, Cloud of Ink, Santiago, 2018
 The Station of Women, novel, Alfaguara, Santiago, 2019

Awards 
Alfaguara Novel Prize 2015 for Contigo en la Distancia.

References

External links 

 Tan lejos, tan cerca, column de Guelfenbein at the dominical magazine Mujer from La Tercera; access 24.26.2019
 Cuento Esa palabra, cultural supplement Babelia from El País, 22.08.2004; access 24.26.2019
 Guelfenbein en Lecturalia
 Carolina Andonie Dracos. El huracán Carla Guelfenbein, interview to the writer on the occasion of being sold out a week after the first edition of La mujer de mi vida was published, El Mercurio, access 11.09.2005
 Carla Guelfenbein en el program Femenino Singular de Literalia Televisión, video, 2009; access 17.12.2011

1959 births
Living people
People from Santiago
Chilean people of Russian-Jewish descent
Chilean Jews
21st-century Chilean novelists
Chilean expatriates in England
Alumni of the University of Essex
Alumni of Saint Martin's School of Art
Chilean women novelists
21st-century Chilean women writers